The House in the Snow-Drifts is a 1928 Soviet drama film directed by Fridrikh Ermler. The story is set in Petrograd in 1919 and follows an unemployed musician who tries to help his sick wife.

The film is based on the short story "The Cave" by Yevgeny Zamyatin. It was released in the Soviet Union on 23 March 1928.

Cast
 Fyodor Nikitin
 Tatyana Okova
 Valeri Solovtsov as Profiteer Neighbour
 A. Bastunova
 Yakov Gudkin
 Galina Shaposhnikova
 Valeri Plotnikov
 Aleksey Maseev

References

1928 drama films
1928 films
Films based on short fiction
Films based on works by Yevgeny Zamyatin
Films directed by Fridrikh Ermler
Soviet drama films
Soviet silent feature films
Soviet black-and-white films
Silent drama films